SerC leader is a putative regulatory RNA structure found upstream of the serC-serA operon in some alpha-proteobacteria. The final stem of the structure overlaps the ribosome binding site of the serC reading frame.

References

External links 
 

Cis-regulatory RNA elements